Steeltown Records was an American record company in Gary, Indiana. The company was founded in 1966 by William  Adams (a.k.a. Gordon Keith) and co-owned with Ben Brown (deceased), Maurice Rogers, Willie Spencer (deceased), and Lou "Ludie" D. Washington (deceased).  The record company was mostly active from 1966 to 1972. Steeltown gave the Jackson 5 their start in the music industry. The Jackson 5's first record was released on the Steeltown label in early 1968, before Motown signed the group in 1969.

Two Jackson 5 singles were recorded for Steeltown at a South Chicago recording studio in 1967, "Big Boy"/"You Changed" and "We Don't Have To Be Over 21 (to Fall in Love)"/"Jam Session". "Big Boy", Michael Jackson's first song, was released on January 31, 1968, by Gordon Keith, who was the manager and producer of the Jackson Five and their songs. "Big Boy" was played on Chicago-Gary area radio stations and became a local hit. The following March, Keith signed a contract with Atlantic Records to manufacture and distribute the "Big Boy"/"You Changed" record nationally. Atco Records, a division of Atlantic Records in New York City, distributed several thousand Steeltown copies with the "Atlantic-Atco" record sleeve. Many of these vinyl records (45 rpm) are still in existence, as are some of the first "Big Boy" singles distributed in Gary by Steeltown. The Rock and Roll Hall of Fame and Museum owns one of the original Steeltown "Big Boy"/"You Changed" records (#681), and this single was on display there in 2010.

The Jacksons moved to Los Angeles, California in 1969. After Ben Brown moved there in 1985, he partnered with Joe Jackson the father of The Jackson 5, and became the president of Jackson Records. In January 2015, Brown's son Dwayne Joseph Brown and his son's business partner, Alicia Barber (songwriter and author whom wrote "Born Rejected"), came together to launch SteelTown Los Angeles. A SteelTown movie is in the works which is set to be released in 2023.

See also
 List of record labels
 List of songs recorded by The Jackson 5
 Michael Jackson

Notes

Bibliography

References

American record labels
Record labels established in 1966
Record labels disestablished in 1972
The Jackson 5
History of Gary, Indiana
Entertainment companies of the United States